Kulkeh Rash may refer to:
 Kulkeh Rash-e Olya
 Kulkeh Rash-e Sofla